The 1963–64 A Group was the 16th season of the A Football Group, the top Bulgarian professional league for association football clubs, since its establishment in 1948.

Overview 
It was contested by 16 teams, and Lokomotiv Sofia won the championship.

League standings

Results

Champions
Lokomotiv Sofia

Top scorers

References 
 Bulgaria - List of final tables (RSSSF)

First Professional Football League (Bulgaria) seasons
Bulgaria
1963–64 in Bulgarian football